The 52nd Da'i al-Mutlaq of the Dawoodi Bohras, Mohammed Burhanuddin died in January 2014. As per the tenets of the sect each predecessor is required to nominate his successor prior to his death. Following his death, a question on succession arose where two rival claimants emerged for the title of 53rd Dā'ī al-Mutlaq: his son, Mufaddal Saifuddin, and his half-brother, Khuzaima Qutbuddin, who was previously Mazoon of the Dawoodi Bohra.

The challenge created a divide in the community with the vast majority aligning with Mufaddal Saifuddin whilst a small number aligned with Khuzaima Qutbuddin. Mufaddal Saifuddin assumed control of the Dawoodi Bohra administration and infrastructure. He is largely accepted as the Bohras' leader by government and other public bodies. The UK Charity Commission has stated in writing, that "our view is that His Holiness Syedna Mufaddal Saifuddin is the current incumbent of the office of Dai al-Mutlaq."

Overview 

Prior to 2014, Mohammed Burhanuddin suffered a stroke in a London on 1 June 2011 and on 4 June 2011, Mufaddal Saifuddin was named his successor. Following this, Mufaddal Saifuddin assumed this role as the successor and his appointment was welcomed by the Dawoodi Bohra community. In the Dawoodi Bohra Mithaq (oath of allegiance), Mufaddal Saifuddin's name was taken alongside Mohammed Burhanuddin's. Together, Burhanuddin and Mufaddal Saifuddin traveled the globe looking after the affairs of the community up until 2014.

Following Burhanuddin's death, Mufaddal took up the office of Da'i al-Mutlaq, as per the appointment by Mohammed Burhanuddin. Khuzaima Qutubuddin claiming to have been appointed heir 50 years earlier in secrecy, challenged Mufaddal's right to be Dai in court.

Mufaddal Saifuddin's Position 
Mufaddal Saifuddin's position is that he has been appointed a number of times in presence of multiple witnesses. These instances are:
 On 27 January 1969 (corresponding to the night of 11th Zil Qa'dah 1388 H) – in the presence of Sh Ibrahim Yamani, Sh Abdulhusain Tambawala & Sh Abdulhusein Sh Ibrahim Abdul Qadir, in Mumbai. This appointment is noted in a diary entry that was shown to the public on 4 February 2014 (4 Rabi al Akhar 1435H) by Mufaddal Saifuddin.
 On 24 October 1994 (corresponding to 20 Jumada al Ula 1415H) in the presence of Sh Abdulhusain Yamani, in Karachi.
 In October/November 2005, during the month of Ramadan 1426H, in the presence of Mohammed Burhanuddin's eldest son Qaidjoher Ezzuddin and Malek al Ashtar Shujauddin, in Bonham House, London.
 On 4 June 2011 (corresponding to 3 Rajab al-Asab 1432H) in Cromwell Hospital, London, in the presence of 6 witnesses.
 On 20 June 2011 (corresponding to 19th Rajab 1432H) in Raudat Tahera, Mumbai in the presence of thousands of community members. This video was live broadcast worldwide to the entire Dawoodi Bohra community.
For three years from 2011 to 2014 Mufaddal Saifuddin assumed the role of Burhanuddin's successor. In the Dawoodi Bohra Mithaq (oath of allegiance), Mufaddal Saifuddin's name was taken alongside Mohammed Burhanuddin's as the successor. Together, Mohammed Burhanuddin and Mufaddal Saifuddin traveled the globe looking after the affairs of the community up until Mohammed Burhanuddin's death in 2014. Henceforth, he assumed the role of the 53rd Da'i al-Mutlaq.

Khuzaima Qutbuddin's Claim 
In 2011 up to 2014, Khuzaima Qutbuddin and his family had publicly declared and congratulated Mufaddal Saifuddin as the successor. On a few occasions, Khuzaima Qutbuddin was seen participating in public gatherings seated below Mufaddal Saifuddin. Until the Mohammed Burhanuddin's death, there wasn't any indication of objection from Khuzaima Qutbuddin.

Khuzaima Qutbuddin challenged this ascension and claimed that  Mohammed Burhanuddin was too ill to have spoken coherently, and medically unfit to move or drink sherbet.

In reply to these allegations, an audio recording of the appointment, and a video recording of the Majlis in Cromwell Hospital was shown to the entire Dawoodi Bohra community on 18 May 2014 (corresponding to 19 Rajab al Asab 1435H). This video confirmed Mohammed Burhanuddin speaking coherently to his family, drinking sherbet and presiding over the Majlis, therefore affirming the events described by Qaidjoher Ezzuddin and the Alvazaratus Saifiyah document. Qutbuddin has not responded to this video.

Following Burhanuddin's death in January 2014, Khuzaima Qutbuddin, claimed the title of the 53rd Dā'ī l-Muṭlaq of the Dawoodi Bohras. Khuzaima Qutbuddin claims that Mohammed Burhanuddin performed nass on him 49 years ago in 1965 a ritual during which he appointed him as his successor in private without any witnesses. Qutbuddin states that Burhanuddin told him that this was because otherwise, 'swords would be crossed'.

The rift between the two claimants started to appear even before the death of Burhanuddin, with followers of Khuzaima Qutbuddin rallying support for Khuzaima. A group formed in 2013 in support of Burhanuddin's half-brother Khuzaima Qutbuddin, who was Mazoon, serving second under Dai al Mutlaq. Khuzaima has denied formation of any separate sect by publishing a public affidavit.

Khuzaima Qutbuddin died on 30 March 2016. On 31 March 2016 the family of Khuzaima Qutbuddin released a statement that Khuzaima Qutbuddin had conferred nass (announcement of successor) on his son Taher Fakhruddin.

Chronological Account of the events in 2011

The Events of 4 June 2011 
On 4 June 2011 (corresponding to 3 Rajab al-Asab 1432H), Mohammed Burhanuddin gathered three of his sons (commonly referred to as Shehzadas), namely Qusai, Idris and Ammar; his daughter Husaina; son in law Dr Moiz, and grandson Abdul Qadir Nooruddin to his room at Cromwell Hospital. He made a declaration appointing his son Mufaddal Saifuddin as his successor, and instructed them to inform the Dawoodi Bohra community. Mohammed Burhanuddin then summoned Mufaddal Saifuddin and his eldest son Qaidjoher Ezzuddin to Cromwell Hospital, where a short Majlis was held in Cromwell Hospital, Mohammed Burhanuddin was congratulated on his appointment, drank sherbet and everyone present performed salaam to Mohammed Burhanuddin and Mufaddal Saifuddin.

These sequence of events were cited in a Majlis held by Qaidjoher Ezzuddin in al Masjid ul Husseini in Northolt; London on 5 June 2011. The video of this Majlis was recorded and was broadcast to the Dawoodi Bohra community centers worldwide on 6 June 2011. These events were also documented in an official report (Arabic: مثال) by the office of His Holiness, Alvazaratus Saifiyah. This document was published and distributed to entire Dawoodi Bohra community during the month of Ramadan in 2011. Khuzaima Qutbuddin is said to have congratulated Mufaddal Saifuddin on his appointment as successor.

Mohammed Burhanuddin's Medical Condition 
At the time of  Mohammed Burhanuddin's stroke his sons, attendant physician and son-in-law, Dr Moiz bhaisaheb and surviving daughter were present in London with him along with other close family members. Neither Qutbuddin nor his family were present before or subsequently.

The medical report presented by Khuzaima Qutbuddin explicitly ruled out the possibility of the Mohammed Burhanuddin having any ability to coherently speak or move.
The review was done by Dr Daniel Mankens, chairman of Neurology Beaumont Hospital, Michigan. Based on this review report, Qutbuddin claimed that 'the succession was not done in London Hospital' as Mohammad Burhanuddin suffered from a 'full stroke at the age of 100 that made it difficult for him to write, speak, or move'.

The doctors behind these reports had never met nor treated Mohammed Burhanuddin at any time and gave their opinions based on medical reports and the explanations provided by Khuzaima Qutbuddin.

Meanwhile, the specialists who actually treated, attended to Mohammed Burhanuddin and who wrote the medical reports do not agree with these opinions. Dr John Francis Costello; Consultant in Respiratory Medicine, and Neurologist Dr Omar Malik, both of whom had attended to Mohammed Burhanuddin at Cromwell Hospital in London have stated, in writing, that His Holiness was capable of making the declaration and of conducting a ceremony, even though his speech was slurred. Further, Dr Costello stated that he believes the report provided by the USA doctor Dr Daniel Menkes is incorrect. He confirmed that his patient, Mohammed Burhanuddin indeed did communicate his wishes on a variety of issues during his admission.

On 4 June, the day of the Nass in question, Dr Costello noted that there was evidence of continued improvement in Mohammed Burhanuddin's health. He confirmed that although he did not witness the said Nass, there was no doubt that Mohammed Burhanuddin was able to effectively communicate his wishes whilst at Cromwell Hospital, particularly in his mother tongue Lisan al-Dawat.

In regards to His Holiness's intellectual state, both Dr Costello and Dr Malik confirmed that he was of sound cognitive state, and that he was able to clearly communicate with his family and medical staff. In regards to the reports by the U.S. doctors, Dr Omar denied there was any evidence of a receptive speech problem. Dr Costello further expressed that he felt a special connection with His Holiness as he often greeted him with a smile of recognition, looked him in the eye, interacted in English, and even become lively at times.

A year later in 2012, Dr Costello was invited on stage to meet  Mohammed Burhanuddin. In his medical report he notes that Burhanuddin instantly smiled at him with recognition, and shook his hand for a lengthy time.

These reports were submitted in court in the sworn affidavit submitted by Shehzada Qaidjoher Ezzuddin, the eldest son of Mohammed Burhanuddin before the Bombay High Court.

The Raudat Tahera Ceremony 
On 8 June 2011, Dr John Francis Costello noted improvements in His Holiness's health and there were discussions about his wishes to travel to Mumbai for to attend the death anniversary of his father Taher Saifuddin which was to be held on 20 June 2011. By 15 June 2011, there was further improvement. Dr John Francis Costello approved of sending His Holiness to Mumbai in an air ambulance as it was deemed safe and appropriate. On this day, Dr Costello recalls having a short coherent conversation in English with His Holiness about his journey to Mumbai. On 17 June 2011, His Holiness was discharged from Cromwell Hospital and traveled to Mumbai, as planned, in an air ambulance. These sequence of events, His Holiness's wishes to travel and the doctor's approval are of paramount significance because the group loyal to Qutbuddin allege that His Holiness was forced to travel against his own will despite suffering a stroke. Dr Costello's letter proves otherwise.

A ceremony was arranged in Raudat Tahera Mumbai on 20 June 2011 (corresponding to 19th Rajab 1432H) to declare Mufaddal Saifuddin as the Dā'ī. The entire ceremony was recorded and was broadcast on the same day to Dawoodi Bohra community centers worldwide. This video was posted by Qutbuddin's website and re-posted by another YouTube user. Images of this ceremony are also available online.

Events following the succession (2011–2014)

Mohammed Burhanuddin's activities after the succession 
From 2011 up to 2014, Mohammed Burhanuddin, despite his stroke, went on pilgrimages, traveled across India, overseas, and presided over many community gatherings.

In 1432H, He presided over the Eid al-Fitr Majlis with Mufaddal Saifuddin seated besides him. Following the Ramadan of 2011 (1432H), Mohammed Burhanuddin went on a pilgrimage to Karbala, Najaf and Cairo.

In the Hijri year of 1433H (November 2011), Mohammed Burhanuddin held the Muharram gatherings in Mumbai. On 2 Muharram Mohammed Burhanuddin conducted the first sermon, and presided over every Majlis at night until Ashura of 1432H. Following this, he traveled to Galiakot to the on a pilgrimage to the mausoleum of Fakhruddin Shaheed. There he performed the opening of the new Mosque of Partapur, Rajasthan on 28 Muharram 1433. In the month of Safar he went on a pilgrimage to Hasanpeer. There, on 4 Safar he performed the opening of the new Masjid in Rampura and named it Mohammedi Masjid. He then traveled to Ahmedabad for Chehlum, where Mufaddal Saifuddin presided over the sermons. During this visit, his son Huzaifa Mohyuddin died in Ahmedabad, and the funeral rites were carried out by Mohammed Burhanuddin and Mufaddal Saifuddin. On 18 January 2012, Narendra Modi visited Burhanuddin in Ahmedabad to offer his condolences. On 20 January 2012, (26 Safar 1433H), he laid the foundation of the Qutbi Mazaar Development Project in Ahmedabad. He then visited Dongam on 27 Safar 1433H.

On 6 Rabi' al-awwal 1433H, he traveled to Pune where he was welcomed by a large gathering. On the 10th of Rabi' al-awwal the Chief Minister of Madhya Pradesh Shivraj Singh Chouhan met Burhanuddin and expressed their condolences on the death of Shahzada Huzaifa Mohiyuddin. On 4 February 2012, on Milad al-Nabi day in Pune, her presided over the Majlis seated above Mufaddal Saifuddin for 3 hours, listening to his entire sermon. On 4 Rabi' al-thani, he presided over the Milad Majlis in Saifee Masjid Mumbai, as Mufaddal Saifuddin conducted the sermons seated besides him.

On 12 March 2012, on the eve of Burhanuddin's 101st birthday, he presided over the birthday celebrations and procession with Narendra Modi seated besides him. The following day, he presided over the Majlis while Mufaddal Saifuddin conducted the sermons seated besides him. In 1433H (August 2012)  Mohammed Burhanuddin presided over the Eid al-Fitr Majlis with Mufaddal Saifuddin seated besides him.

On 19 June 2012 (30 Rajab 1433H), Mohammed Burhanuddin traveled to London. On 11 Sha'ban 1433H (30 June 2012), Asif Ali Zardari visited him at Masjid ul Husseini London. In a public congregation at Masjid ul Husseini London on 14 July 2012, Dr Costello was invited on stage to meet Mohammed Burhanuddin. In his medical report he notes that he instantly smiled at him with recognition, and shook his hand for a lengthy time.

In the Hijri year of 1434H (November 2012), Mohammed Burhanuddin held the Muharram gatherings in Surat. On 27 November 2012 (14 Moharram 1434H), he held the Nikah ceremony of community members in the Rasme Saify ceremony in Surat. In Mumbai, on 27 May 2013 (18 Rajab 1434H) he presided over the death anniversary of Taher Saifuddin and the final day examinations of Al Jamea tus Saifiyah.

In the Hijri year of 1435H (November 2013), Mohammed Burhanuddin held the Muharram gatherings in Mumbai. For 10 days, Mufaddal Saifuddin conducted the sermons during the day, and Burhanuddin would preside over the Majlis at night. On the day of Ashura Burhanuddin presided over the sermons conducted by Mufaddal Saifuddin.

On 12 January 2014, he presided over the Majlis of Milad al-Nabi in Raudat Tahera, Mumbai. This was the his last public gathering before his death five days later on 17 January 2014.

Mufaddal Saifuddin's activities after the succession 
Mufaddal Saifuddin assumed this role as the successor of Mohammed Burhanuddin and his appointment was welcomed by the Dawoodi Bohra community. Together, Mohammed Burhanuddin and Mufaddal Saifuddin undertook the leadership after the affairs of the community.

On 9 June 2011, then Chief Minister of Gujarat, Narendra Modi congratulated Mufaddal Saifuddin on his succession. On 15 June 2011 the office of Mohammed Burhanuddin, The Alvazaratus Saifiyah instructed Dawoodi Bohras to take Mufaddal Saifuddin's name alongside Mohammed Burhanuddin's as the successor in their Mithaq (oath of allegiance).

A month later, in Sha'ban, Mufaddal Saifuddin led the examinations of Al Jamea tus Saifiyah on behalf of Mohammed Burhanuddin. During the month of Ramadan and Eid al-Fitr, Saifuddin led the community prayers and Mohammed Burhanuddin presided over the Eid al-Fitr Majlis with Mufaddal Saifuddin seated besides him. Following the Ramadan of 2011 (1432H), Mohammed Burhanuddin went on a pilgrimage to Karbala, Najaf and Cairo.

In the Hijri year of 1433H (November 2011), Mohammed Burhanuddin held the Muharram gatherings in Mumbai. On 2 Muharram  Mohammed Burhanuddin conducted the first sermon and instructed Mufaddal Saifuddin to conduct the remaining nine sermons until Ashura seated besides him.

On 4 January 2012, on Milad al-Nabi day in Pune, as his successor Mufaddal Saifuddin conducted the sermon on behalf of Mohammed Burhanuddin. Burhanuddin sat besides him for 3 hours listening to Saifuddin's entire sermon. On 12 March 2012, on the eve of Mohammed Burhanuddin's 101st birthday. Narendra Modi attended the birthday celebrations and procession besides Mohammed Burhanudin and Mufaddal Saifuddin. The following day, as the successor, Mufaddal Saifuddin conducted the sermons with Mohammed Burhanuddin seated on the stage besides him. On 4 Rabi' al-thani, he conducted the sermons of the Milad Majlis in Saifee Masjid Mumbai, with Mohammed Burhanuddin seated besides him. On 1 April 2012, he conducted the sermon and Majlis of Fatima Al Zahra on 10 Jumada al-awwal 1433H in Surat. On 9 Rajab1433H (29 May 2012), he led annual examinations of Al Jamea tus Saifiyah on behalf of Mohammed Burhanuddin in Saify Mahal, Mumbai.

During the month of Ramadan 1433H (August 2012) and Eid al-Fitr, Saifuddin led the community prayers and Mohammed Burhanuddin presided over the Eid al-Fitr Majlis with Mufaddal Saifuddin seated besides him. Following that, Mohammed Burhanuddin appointed Mufaddal Saifuddin as the Amir al-hajj for the Hajj pilgrimage on 14 October 2012 (29 Zil Qadah 1433H).

In the Hijri year of 1434H (November 2012), Mohammed Burhanuddin held the Muharram gatherings in Surat. Mufaddal Saifuddin to conducted ten sermons until Ashura with Mohammed Burhanuddin seated besides him.

Mufaddal Saifuddin's first official correspondence as successor was in May 2013 during the celebration of Mohammed Burhanuddin's Golden Jubilee, in which he instructed the community to set out on religious pilgrimages. In the month of Rajab of 2013, he conducted the annual examinations of Al Jamea tus Saifiyah on behalf of Mohammed Burhanuddin.

In the Hijri year of 1435H (November 2013), Mohammed Burhanuddin held the Muharram gatherings in Mumbai. For 10 days, Mufaddal Saifuddin conducted the sermons during the day, and Mohammed Burhanuddin would preside over the Majlis at night. On the day of Ashura Mufaddal Saifuddin conducted the Ashura sermon seated besides Mohammed Burhanuddin.

On 23 December 2013, Mufaddal Saifuddin traveled to Udaipur to conduct the sermons of Chehlum 1435H. A video recording of this sermons was broadcast in community centers worldwide on 16 January 2014.

Khuzaima Qutbuddin and his family had even publicly declared and congratulated Mufaddal Saifuddin as the successor. On a few occasions, Khuzaima Qutbuddin was seen participating in public gatherings seated below Mufaddal Saifuddin. Until Mohammed Burhanuddin's death, there wasn't any indication of objection from Khuzaima Qutbuddin.

Events following Mohammed Burhanuddin's death 

Mohammed Burhanuddin died on 17 January 2014 [1] (corresponding to 16 Rabi al Awwal 1435H) in Mumbai, India.

Mufaddal Saifuddin, who had already been publicly appointed and accepted as the successor, assumed the position of the 53rd Da'i al-Mutlaq of the Dawoodi Bohra community. Saifuddin was in Colombo at the time and immediately traveled to Mumbai via Chennai. He conducted his first Jumu'ah Salah in Sri Lanka and arrived in Saify Mahal, Mumbai that evening to conduct and lead the Janaza and funeral rites. Khuzaima Qutbuddin, who at the time was already in Saify Mahal, Mumbai, left for his residence in Thane prior to Mufaddal Saifuddin's arrival. Mufaddal Saifuddin led the Janaza rites throughout the night. and thousands of mourners attended the funeral on Saturday 18 January 2014 led by Mufaddal Saifuddin.

On the morning of Saturday 18 January, as the Janaza left Saify Mahal en route to Raudat Tahera for burial, Khuzaima Qutbuddin sent out an email campaign to Dawoodi Bohra Community members attaching a PDF letter addressed to Mufaddal Saifuddin stating his claim. That evening, around 36 hours after Mohammed Burhanuddin's death, Qutbuddin posted a YouTube video of himself on his website claiming that he was the 53rd Da'i al-Mutlaq, having been appointed in total secrecy in 1965.

On 20 January 2014, Khuzaima Qutbuddin's name was removed Dawoodi Bohra from all official community records as the Mazoon. Following that, on 24 January 2014, Khuzaima Qutbuddin issued a Public Notice claiming that he was the sole Trustee of all the Wakfs/Trusts of the Dawoodi Bohra Community.

On 30 January 2014, thousands of Dawoodi Bohras gathered at Azad Maidan, Mumbai in support of Mufaddal Saifuddin as the 53rd Da'i al-Mutlaq, pledged their allegiance to him and dissociated from the breakaway faction formed by Khuzaima Qutbuddin. Mufaddal's elder brother Qaidjoher Ezzuddin stated that "nass was performed on Mufaddal not once but a number of times". Similarly peace marches were organised in community centers worldwide where resolutions were signed handed over to Government officials. A number of prominent personalities offered their condolences to Mufaddal Saifuddin as Mohammed Burhanuddin's son and successor.

In April 2014, Khuzaima Qutbuddin filed action in the Mumbai High Court against the succession of Mufaddal Saifuddin.

Support for the claimants

Saifuddin 
 Mohammed Burhanuddin died in January 2014. Mufaddal Saifuddin led the last rituals in which hundreds of thousands of Bohras joined. It is reported that when he made his first public appearance on a temporary bridge connecting Saifee Masjid and Raudat Tahera mausoleum after Syedna's demise, hundreds of thousands of Dawoodi Bohras' standing gave an "indication of who they have believed to be their 53rd Dā'ī al-Muṭlaq". Indian Express further reports that "Many Bohras have accepted Burhanuddin's second son Syedi Mufaddal Saifuddin as Syedna".
 Around 90% majority of the community support Mufaddal Saifuddin as the rightful leader of 2.5 million Dawoodi Bohras living in 100 countries.
 The Indian foreign minister, Salman Khurshid, on 28 Rabi' al-thani 1435 AH (28 February 2014 CE) arrived to offer condolences to Mufaddal Saifuddin at Burhanuddin's residence Saifee Mahal, Mumbai. It is reported that he presented a letter of good wishes from Sonia Gandhi as Saifuddin left for his first trip abroad, after "accession to the.. Dā'ī office".
 A number of prominent personalities offered their condolences to Mufaddal Saifuddin as Mohammed Burhanuddin's son and successor.
 Around 50,000 followers of Mufaddal Saifuddin gathered at a public ground in Mumbai to "endorse their solidarity and offer their condolences" to their "new spiritual leader". According to the official association handling the affairs of Dawoodi Bohras in Mumbai, Qutbuddin's "wrongful claim" has aggrieved community members, as they had witnessed "nass" in 2011 in Mumbai which "had [been] reaffirmed … on many occasions".
 Followers of Mufaddal Saifuddin staged peace marches and submitted a memos protesting his half brother's claim in Bhopal, Surat, and 'in various parts of the country'.
 Professors and students and teachers of the 200-year-old Arabic teaching academy in Surat and its branches and various state heads have recognized Mufaddal Saifuddin as the successor.

Qutbuddin 
 The former Chief Justice of India, AM Ahmadi, in his personal stand, accepted Khuzaima Qutbuddin as the rightful successor. As per report, Ahmadi also said that he "examined the documents and believe that Qutbuddin's stand of the 53rd Dā'ī is principled" in his opinion.
 Abdeali Qutbuddin, son of Khuzaima Qutbuddin, claimed that they have around 450,000 (450,000) followers.
 Other sources state that his support ranges from as much as 500 people.
 The faction supporting Mufaddal Saifuddin as the Dā'ī, has excommunicated Qutbuddin and his followers. However, there is no official confirmation from the community on the alleged ex-communication while the progressive members have called a ban on this practice citing it illegal.

Un-decided 

The Progressive Dawoodi Bohra took a neutral stance in wake of the succession controversy, citing dubious claims of both the would-be successors and the wealth accumulated by Burhanuddin's family. The Progressives' Central Board warned the claimants that they would be "consigned to the dustbins of history" if they do not adapt and act more fairly. Several community members interviewed welcomed the court action as they looked forward to corruption in the community being exposed.

The Times of India reported that "most Dawoodi Bohra back Burhanuddin's second son, Mufadda Saifuddin, and hold him as its 53rd spiritual leader". There were reports that some Bohras who support Qutbuddin have been forced to swear allegiance to Saifuddin through social isolation and threats of divorce between married couples. A cover story on the Bohra survey revealed that most Bohras (46%) support Khuzaima over Mufaddal and many are in the community due to fear and force Disquiet among Bohras However, the neutrality of this survey poll has been disputed citing reasons that it was carried out by an anonymous group, where the majority of the respondents were not Bohras, and it did not get any statistics from the Dawoodi Bohra head office in Mumbai. The survey was carried out by 399 respondents (0.0004% of community) from which a majority of respondents did not belong to the Dawoodi Bohra community, thus questioning the bias and validity of the report. Further, the article that was published in the Hindustan Times and the Mumbai Mirror had contradictory results with glaring dissimilarities among poll statistics, whereas the same media outlets had previously published that hundreds of thousands had gathered in support of Mufaddal Saifuddin, once again questioning the validity of the survey.

Historical significance 
The issue is also historic in the sense that similar case was put up in the court of Mughal emperor Akbar, in year 1591AD, where succession was challenged. There is also a unique case (Chandabhoy Galla Case) filed in the British time court in Mumbai, in 1917 and decided in 1921, where claim was based on modality of succession earlier done. In both of these cases the challenger was defeated, Dawood Bin Qutub remained Dai in 1591AD and, ownership of the Chandabhoy Galla remained with Taher Saifuddin.

Court cases 
In January 2014, Qutbuddin published a public affidavit on his website declaring his position and legal status of properties, claiming to be the sole trustee of all the trusts in the Dawoodi Bohra community. Qutbuddin filed petitions against Saifuddin concerning the succession controversy in Bombay High court and Gujrat High Court. Khuzaima published a public affidavit on his website declaring his position and legal status of properties

Gujarat High Court case 
The Gujarat High Court issued an interim order on 16 April 2014 prohibiting Saifuddin from acting as the 53rd Dā'ī and his supporters from dealing with the trust properties. Khuzaima filed eight writ petitions before Gujarat High Court pertaining to the succession controversy. This order was rescinded to allow Mufaddal Saifuddin full control over and use of all properties in Gujarat, provided that as the sole trustee, nothing is done to degenerate the value of the trust, effectively allowing him to operate as the 53rd Dai, but without granting such recognition. This situation was to remain pending the outcome of the Bombay High Court.

UK Charity Commission 
In May 2014, Khuzaima Qutbuddin approached the UK Charity Commission claiming that there was no valid appointee as the Da'i al-Mutlaq. On 15 August 2014, the UK Charity Commission altered their position in favour of Mufaddal Saifuddin. The commission established that there is someone in office, albeit that their position is being challenged. They also stated in writing, that "our view is therefore that His Holiness Syedna Mufaddal Saifuddin is the current incumbent of the office of Dai al-Mutlaq." They further stated that Mufaddal Saifuddin can continue to administer the Charity until the outcome of the Bombay High Court case is known.

Bombay High Court Suit No. 337 of 2014 
The late Mohammed Burhanuddin's half-brother Qutbuddin went to the High Court claiming the position of 53rd and to restrict Saifuddin from discharging the duties as the 53rd Dā'ī. The prime contention of the 700-page petition to the High Court was to have Qutbuddin, the half-brother, legally declared as the 53rd Dā'ī al-Mutlaq of the 1.2-million-strong Bohra community, while simultaneously preventing his nephew, Mufaddal Saifuddin, from acting as the Dā'ī.

Justice SJ Kathawala of the Bombay High Court recused himself from hearing the suit filed by Qutbuddin as he had appeared for the Mohammed Burhanuddin in the past, creating a conflict of interest. The Lawyers appearing for Saifuddin had no objection to Justice SJ Kathawala from hearing the suit, however Qutbuddin's lawyer Mr Kadam requested the judge to recuse himself from the case. This delayed the suit before being placed before Justice Gautam Patel at the High Court.

Qutbuddin sought relief including entry to Saify Mahal, the house of the community leader,filed a 700-page suit asking the court to restrain Mufaddal Saifuddin to act as the Da'i al-Mutlaq. In reply to the suit, defendant Mufaddal Saifuddin filed a detailed 494-page affidavit on 23 April 2014. Justice Gautam Patel said it would be better to hold the trial rather than decide on interim relief. The Bombay High Court later agreed that it is willing to conduct a speedy, day-to-day trial

Framing of Issues 
In September 2014, the court had framed issues in the matter, where each side will have to prove he was conferred valid nass, or the official declaration of succession. The matter was then fixed for 11 December 2014, to determine the admissibility of the documents placed on record by both sides. The issues framed on 15 September 2014 in Suit No. 336 of 2014 were:
 What are the requirements of a valid Nass as per the tenets of the faith?
 Whether the Plaintiff proves that a valid Nass was conferred/pronounced on him as stated in the Plaint?
 Whether a Nass once conferred cannot be retracted or revoked or changed or superseded?
 Whether the Defendant proves that a valid Nass was conferred on him by the 52nd Dai: On 28 January 1969, in the year 2005, on 4 June 2011, On 20 June 2011 as stated in the written statement and if the answer is in the negative then whether any Nass proved on the Defendant as above consequently amounts to a retraction or revocation or change or supersession of any Nass previously conferred on the Plaintiff by the 52nd Dai?
The case began with the new judge asking Qutbuddin, what requirements had to be fulfilled for "pronouncing a Syedna's successor", such as witnesses, publicity and acceptance by the community. He also asked Qutbuddin to spell out what he did to establish his right as the spiritual head since 2011 when his nephew was publicly pronounced the successor by the late Mohammed Burhanuddin. This followed a reply from Saifuddin's attorney and the Mohammed Burhanuddins eldest son Qaidjoher Ezzuddin, which contested Qutbuddin's claim.
On behalf of Mufaddal Saifuddni, Ezzuddin stated that there was "overwhelming evidence" that Saifuddin was chosen by the late Dai to be his successor and between 2011 when he was appointed the successor and in January 2014 when the 52nd Dai died – Saifuddin "operated within the community as the successor designate". Also, after his father's demise, Saifuddin was given misaq (oath of allegiance) by 500 Jamaats all over the world and high dignitaries.

"As per court proceedings, Qutbuddin's lawyer pointed out that Saifuddin's earlier pleading of succession was only referring the pronouncement done in year 2011 at London hospital, but after demise of late Syedna, now the case is put up in different way and now it refers that pronouncements were 'made in 1969, 1994 and 2005 and only reconfirmation was done in 2011'."

Qutbuddin alleged that "[s]ince 1980, defendant (Saifuddin) and his family implemented a devious scheme to malign him" Justice Patel declined Kadam's plea to pass an order for access to Qutbuddin to his office in Saify Mahal and his apartment at Al Azhar. "They say they are not preventing you," said Justice Patel.

Cross-examination of The Planitiff Petitioner 
Cross-examination of Khuzaima Qutbuddin (Plaintiff) (PW1)

The cross examination of Qutbuddin commenced on 27 April 2015. with Qutbuddin taking to the witness box eight times until his death.

1) 27 April 2015: Qutbuddin claimed that there were indications of support from his siblings, however none of his 20 siblings openly supported him, nor did they give their Mithaq to him.

Saifuddin's counsel Iqbal Chagla questioned Qutbuddin on the meaning of various terminologies used in the community and degrees for knowledge of scriptures awarded by Al Jamea tus Saifiyah and conferred by the Dai. Qutbuddin admitted to being conferred the degree of Al Aleem Al Bare (The Outstanding Scholar) by his father, Taher Saifuddin but denied he was conferred any degree by his late brother Mohammed Burhanuddin. This was to bring forth his knowledge of Islamic studies and degrees being conferred by the principal of the Dawoodi Bohra community's educational institute. Qutbuddin also told the court that the highest title is the Umdat al Ulama al Muwahhadeen (support of unparalleled scholar), which was given to Burhanuddin by the 51st dai.

Qutbuddin claimed that he did not challenge Saifuddin's claims at the time because he (Qutbuddin) had been asked to maintain his appointment in confidence by Mohammed Burhanuddin. He prayed and hoped that "Syedna Burhanuddin Saheb would recover and set the position right in the manner he deemed appropriate".

2) 28 April 2015: Qutbuddin admitted to being informed that a majlis was to be held on 6 June 2011 at Saifee Masjid and the reason for it. When asked what the reason for the majlis was, Qutbuddin replied,"The majlis was because His Holiness' health was not good and an announcement was to be made of the alleged nass conferred on the defendant (Saifuddin)." He admitted to drinking the celebratory sherbet offered. "That was routine," said Qutbuddin. When asked if the majlis had been convened for condolence, would sherbet have been offered, he replied,"No." He added that the majlis was not a condolence meeting. "I did, in fact, pray for the long life of the Syedna," he said.

Qutbuddin also said that two attempts were made to kill him; first in Indore during Muharram and the second in Yemen, however, he named no suspects, nor dates, in court.

3) 29 July 2015: Qutbuddin said that he was referred to as al Walad al Ahabb, meaning the 'beloved son'. According to him, this carried the meaning that he was the successor. Counsel Iqbal Chagla, however, suggested to him that one Hussain Dawoodbhai of Sri Lanka was also referred to as al Walad al Ahabb. Qutbuddin alleged that the meaning may be the same but the context was different.

Qutbuddin also confirmed that shortly after Mohammed Burhanuddin's stroke in 2011, he had called Qaidjoher Ezzuddin in London to wish Burhanuddin and his successor.

4) – 31 July 2015: Qutbuddin told Court he was very hurt at being prevented from visiting Raudat Tahera. Chagla asked him if there has been a single instance when he was prevented. Qutbuddin replied that he had sent his sons to visit the mausoleum a few months ago. "They were actually beaten and pushed away.'' he said. But Chagla asked, "Have you personally been prevented from visiting the Raudat Tahera?''. He replied "I did not go because my security advised me not to do so.". When Chagla asked if the statement that he was prevented from visiting is incorrect, Qutbuddin said, "I don't agree. I stand by my statement.''

Counsel Iqbal Chagla, showed several documents to Qutbuddin and sought his reply on whether those were written by the 52nd Dai and whether he recognized it. To some he accepted and to some he replied in the negative or sought to study them.

5) – 3 August 2015: Qutbuddin claimed that even his father, Taher Saifuddin, had viewed him as a successor. In an earlier hearing, he alleged that Mohammed Burhanuddin had appointed him as the Mazoon and gave a sermon, at that time he said 'I was a beloved son', and this carried the meaning that he was his successor. He again reiterated the same thing by saying that it is correct that his appointment as Mazoon was done in a public sermon by the 52nd Dai.

6) – 4 August 2015: Qutbuddin was asked about the exact phrase used by Mohammed Burhanuddin in his sermon on 10 December 1965 and when according to him, he said that you are his beloved son? Qutbuddin replied, "Al-waladul-ahabb." Chagla asked him whether the translation of Al-walad ul-ahabb meant the beloved son or my beloved son. Qutbuddin maintained it meant  my beloved son. He was then shown paragraph 28 (a) at page 64 of his plaint where it stated "my [lit. 'the'] beloved son". Qutbuddin was questioned as to what the meaning of [lit. 'the'] was and whether he agreed that the meaning of the phrase was in fact the beloved son. Qutbuddin said that he was confused as to why he said "my" when the translation provided by his son in the plaint stated the words "[lit. 'the']". When asked whether the translation done in the plaint was incorrect, he said he was confused. Around more than 400 questions were asked in which the examination centered around the sermon of 52nd Dai which mentioned the word "beloved son".

7) 24 August 2015: Chagla asked Qutbuddin whether Mufaddal Saifuddin and his brothers were his pupils in matters of "spiritual guidance ". He replied, "Not regularly. But only once in a while". When asked how often, he replied, "They were regular during one period of time but not later." He said Burhanuddin sent his sons to him and this was for about ten years during his reign. While he could not remember the exact period they were his pupils, Qutbuddin added that they came to him from the time of his father, the 51st Dai.

Qutbuddin later stated that "if not all then many" persons of higher spiritual value knew he was made the mansoos (successor) and even offered him sajda (prostration). He alleged that Saifuddin and his brothers used to offer him sajda. When asked whether sajda (physical prostration) could be offered to a person other than a dai, Qutbuddin said, "Sajda is offered only to a dai or the mansoos or to a person known as one who will succeed the dai." "I remember my sisters would sometimes do so (offer him sajda). I do not remember if my brothers did it".

8) 25 August 2015: Qutbuddin stated that in the last years of his life, Mohammed Burhanuddin was not as mentally alert as he used to be. When advocate Iqbal Chagla asked whether Mohammed Burhanuddin was in full control of his mental and physical faculties till the end, Qutbuddin answered, "I felt and believed that his health had deteriorated during the last two and a half years of his life." He said Burhanuddin was "unable to function and carry out his activities as before."

Status of case following the death of Khuzaima Qutbuddin (Plaintiff) 
The hearings were later fixed from 22 April to 2 May 2016, however, after Khuzaima Qutbuddin's death on 30 March 2016, the Bombay High Court cancelled these two dates.

According to Indian law, upon the death of a plaintiff a suit will not abate immediately upon death but rather after 90 days if no action is taken by the legal heirs or representatives of the plaintiff. As Fakhruddin intends to continue the case, it is likely that such an application would be made and the case would not abate. Accordingly, Justice Patel also said if Fakhruddin decides that he would like to be substituted as plaintiff he will have to file a chamber summons to set aside the abatement of the suit, and that "Nobody requires an order that that the suit has abated".
On 4 July 2016, Taher Fakhruddin reported that he has written a letter to Mufaddal Saifuddin in which he mentions that he has filed a Chamber Summons in the Bombay High Court as the plaintiff in place of his late father Khuzaima Qutbuddin.

A senior counsel commented that the Da'i al-Mutlaq is not a hereditary title that can be passed on from a father to a son; it is an appointment that is made. This is the basis on which Khuzaima Qutbuddin had challenged the naming of Mufaddal Saifuddin as the 53rd Syedna. Taher Fakhruddin will have to prove that his father had been appointed as the Syedna, and only then can he claim the same. On 7 March 2017, Justice Gautam Patel allowed Taher Fakhruddin's plea to be substituted as plaintiff in this suit, stating that although Taher Fakhruddin was free to file a separate suit, including him in the current suit would save judicial time, money and valuable amounts of paper. The matter was set for direction on 25 April 2017. The court then fixed the dates of 8, 11 and 12 December 2017 for the cross examination of Taher Fakhruddin.

Cross-examination of Taher Fakhruddin (Petitioner) (PW2)

The cross examination of Taher Fakhruddin commenced on 8 December 2017.

8 December 2017: Anand Desai appeared for Taher Fakhruddin.  The petitioner submits letters as evidence. Examination-in-chief of Fakhruddin, Anand Desai cross examined Fakhruddin asking him the function of the mazoon mutlaq and mukasir, to which he replied that "Mazoon administers the oath to the believers, shows them the position of the Dai" and the "mukasir does what the Dai wants them to do and that they don't have absolute authority". On the subject of nass, Fakhruddin said there was no one prescribed method, but there must be a clear communication of nass in the form of a direct statement by the preceding dai to the one he confers the nass, or there must be an indication from the Dai. He further claimed that no witnesses were needed during nass, and there were historical precedents for a private nass. He stated that a nass is irrevocable and final, "It can't be changed or superseded". He was also asked as to what happens when a successor passes away before the dai. He added that 6th Dai told 7th dai whom to appoint as 8th Dai; and the 28th Dai appointed the 29th Dai in accordance with the wishes of the 27th Dai.

22 March 2018: Justice Gautam Patel commented on what appeared to be contradictions between Taher Fakhruddin's written submissions and his court testimony in regard to Taher Fakhruddin's statements that Queen Arwa al-Sulayhi was 'to be the single witness to the nass he conferred via the Sijil-ul-Bisharat.' This contradiction was pointed out three times, following which Justice Patel expressed his impatience with the slow pace of this case into its fourth year.

27 November 2018: The Plaintiff Taher Fakhruddin, filed Case No.2:18-cv00043-BCW in the United States District Court for the District of Utah Central Division on 16 January 2018. The Defendant filed a Notice of Motion for an anti-Suit injunction against the Plaintiff. The judge agreed to proceed with the case subject to that withdrawal being effected. The Plaintiff Taher Fakhruddin withdrew the Suit in the Utah District Court on 28 November 2018 and confirmed that confirms no fresh proceedings will be initiated in any other Court anywhere in the world until final disposal of the present Suit.

His final cross examination was held on 28 and 29 January 2019.

A cross examination of Professor Wilferd Madelung was scheduled from 11 to 15 March 2019, however, he was unable to attend and the cross examination of 'PW4' was scheduled for 25 and 26 April 2019. He later withdrew from the case and a new foreign witness was arranged to testify on 25 September 2019. This was later rescheduled for direction on 5 November 2019.

Cross-examination of Devin Stewart (PW3)

The plaintiffs contacted Professor Devin J. Stewart, Professor of Arabic and Islamic Studies at Emory University, for his opinion on their claims. He submitted his opinions in an affidavit on 15 July as PW3. His testimony took place from 29 November to 5 December 2019. Stewart was asked around 80 questions on the topic of Imamate and nass. He stated that the nass of the 12th Imam, and 20th Imam took place without any witnesses, and in the case of Arwa al-Sulayhi, she is considered a witness because she received a letter informing her about the appointment. He reiterated the plaintiff's stance that nass is irrevocable and requires no witnesses.

Cross-examination of Husain Qutbuddin (PW4)

The cross examination of Husain Qutbuddin took place on 23, 24, 27 and 28 January 2020, and later on 18 and 20 February 2020.

Cross-examination of the Defendants 
On 27 January, Justice Gautam Patel asked Senior Counsel Mr. Iqbal Chagla to submit the Defendant's list of witnesses, with a view to beginning cross-examination of the Defendant and their witnesses in April 2020. The lawyers appearing for Mufaddal Saifuddin confirmed that he will not be appearing as a witness.

Cross-examination of Dr Omar Malik (DW1)

Dr Omar Malik was the neurologist who treated Mohammed Burhanuddin in London after he suffered a stroke. His cross-examination took place from 2 to 4 February 2021. Due to the [[COVID-19 pandemic]], the Bombay High Court set up a video link for his cross-examination at the International Dispute Resolution Centre (IDRC) in London. Dr Malik was questioned about his affidavit in which he stated that he had no doubt that Mohammed Burhanuddin was capable of communicating his wishes and instructions during his stay at the hospital. Two London based firms, CMS represented the plaintiff and Herbert Smith Freehills LLP represented the defendant.

Cross-examination of Dr John Costello (DW2)

The cross-examimation of Dr John Francis Costello; Consultant in Respiratory Medicine took place on 30 and 31 March 2021. Some of the questions concerned to the Glasgow Coma Scale in relation to Mohammed Burhanuddin's medical condition on 4 June 2011. Dr. Costello maintained that every time he saw the 52nd Dai he was fine, as his condition could vary every hour.

Cross-examination of Abdul Quadir Nooruddin (DW3)

The cross-examination of Abdul Qadir Nooruddin (DW3) was scheduled for 9, 10 & 11 June 2021 but later deferred due to the pandemic-related restrictions. The Defendant also filed an application in relation to some news reports, which was listed on 21 June 2021.

21 June 2021: The court called upon petitioner in the case Taher Fakhruddin Saheb and online publication Udaipur Times (UT) to explain how access to trial records pertinent to the case was made available to the media. In his order, Justice Patel demanded a personal explanatory affidavit from the plaintiff with an appropriately worded apology and an undertaking. He also directed the plaintiff to personally remain present at the next online hearing.

Justice Patel admonished the plaintiff for "assuming it was perfectly all right to put these links on social media, when it was most emphatically not". "If the Plaintiff believes that a litigation like this is going to be more satisfactorily addressed on social media or in print media, he is welcome to invite a dismissal of his suit, one that I will accompany with an extremely significant order of costs," Justice Patel cautioned the plaintiff.

He also stated that since it was the plaintiff who had approached the Court, the plaintiff was "rigidly subject to the Court's discipline, procedure and rules". "It makes not the slightest difference who the Plaintiff is or he imagines himself to be," Justice Patel added. Justice Patel warned that if there was a single infraction after this, no matter how slight, he would initiate contempt proceedings against the plaintiff for "interfering with the administration of justice" and that he would immediately dismiss the suit with costs.

On 14 July 2021: The Affidavit of the Plaintiff (Taher Fakhruddin) was affirmed overseas. for the Defendant. The affirmed copy is to be filed in the Registry on or before 23 July 2021.

Dr Birendra Saraf, Senior Advocate appeared for the 2nd Respondent, The Udaipur Times and submitted an affidavit.

On 27 July 2021: The Affidavits were filed by both the respondents, and the defendant/applicant. Both respondents tendered their apology and the court did not think it was necessary to enlarge the controversy of this interim application. The Judge commented that in his view, the Udaipur Times (2nd Respondent) had gone beyond what is legitimately permissible.Hon. Judge went on to explain that, "fair reporting of court proceedings does not extend to comments on the quality of evidence or arguments before a Court before judgment is delivered", and the methodology of court reporting. Based on the undertaking by both respondents, the court proceeded to dismiss the interim application.

On 30 July 2021: the dates for the cross examination of the defendant's 3rd witness was scheduled for 13–17 September 2021, and 8 to 12 November 2021. The affidavits were to be filed on or before 9 August 2021 and 30 August 2021 respectively.

On 11 October: Approximately 100 documents were tendered by the defendants as evidence. These are the documents were admitted by the Plaintiff but the correctness denied. DW3 Mr Abdulqadir Moiz Nooruddin, was present in the witness box and the cross examination of 3 witnesses was to be taken up.

On 13 October 2021: Six video clips and a delicate document (exhibit D490) were submitted as evidence.

On 21 October 2021: The Bombay High Court  directed the defendant to pay Rs 30 lakh as costs for delaying the trial to be donated to charitable organisations; St. Jude India Child Care Centres at Sewri and The Society for Rehabilitation of Crippled Children at Mahalaxmi. and extended the time till 30 October 2021 for the evidence of philologist Professor Ramzi Baalbaki.

The Judge allowed the defendant to lead the evidences for fives more witnesses:

 DW1: Dr. Omar Malik, neurologist at the Bupa Cromwell Hospital in London
 DW2: Dr. John Costello, physician at the Bupa Cromwell Hospital in London
 DW3: Abdulqadir Moiz Nooruddin
 DW4: Taher Shaikh Abdulhusein Tambawala
 DW5: Kauserali Shaikh Abdulhusein Yamani
 DW6: Mohammed Shaikh Yusuf Rampurawala
 DW7: Saifuddin Shaikh Fidaali Heptulla
 DW8: Abdeabiturab Shaikh Abdulhusain Rangwala
 DW9: Shehzada Malekulashtar Shujauddin - (witness of fact, in relation to the 4 June 2011 Nass in UK)
 DW10: Dr. Ramzi Mounir Baalbaki, as an expert in translation from Arabic to English
 DW11: Dr. Samer Traboulsi - (as an expert on doctrine)
 DW12: Dr. Christopher Davies - as a handwriting expert, Forensic Document Examiner
 DW13: Kinana Mudar Dawoodi (Jamaluddin) -  (as an expert on doctrine)

On 22, 23 November, and 3 December 2021 the following witnesses were cross-examined: Taher Tambawala, Kausarali Yamani, Mohammed Rampurawala, Saifuddin Hebatulla, and Abdeabiturab Rangwala.

The cross-examinations of the defendant continued on 14, 15, 16, 17, 28, 29, 30 June; and 1, 5 , 6 July 2022.

Parties propose to complete the evidence by the end of August 2022. On 6 September 2022, the Hon’ble Justice Gautam Patel passed an order noting that the cross-examination of the Defendant’s witnesses has concluded and listed the matter on 17, 18, and 19 October 2022 to pass Orders on objections, marking of documents in evidence, and other matters.

References 

Dawoodi Bohras
Islam-related controversies
Controversies in India
Rival successions
2010s in India